This was a new event to the 2015 ITF Women's Circuit.

The top seed Luksika Kumkhum won the inaugural event, defeating sixth-seeded Chang Kai-chen in the final, 1–6, 7–5, 6–1.

Seeds

Main draw

Finals

Top half

Bottom half

References 
 Main draw

ITF Women's Circuit - Xuzhou - Singles